

History
Women's rock climbing started out as a socially oriented mixed gender sport in Australia at the start of the twentieth century.  Women wore the same restrictive costumes that they wore in other sports of the era like golf and cricket.

By 1954, women were members of the Sydney Rock Climbing Club and were participating in club events alongside their male counterparts.

Participation
In 1940, a study of 314 women in New Zealand and Australia was done. Most of the women in the study were middle class, conservative, Protestant and white. The study found that 183 participated in sport.  The nineteenth most popular sport that these women participated in was mountaineering/hill climbing, with 2 having played the sport.  The sport was tied with cricket, mountaineering, rowing, and surfing.

Women were climbing at Katoomba in New South Wales by 1934.

Media
Women's rock climbing was being reported in Australian newspaper in 1930.  The media described the women who participated in the sport as "intrepid."

See also

Rock climbing in Australia
Sport Climbing Australia

References

Bibliography

 
 

Rock climbing
Rock climbing
Climbing in Australia